The 1995 UAB Blazers football team represented the University of Alabama at Birmingham (UAB) in the 1995 NCAA Division I-AA football season, and was the fifth team fielded by the school. The Blazers were led by head coach was Watson Brown, in his first season as the UAB's head coach. They played their home games at Legion Field in Birmingham, Alabama and competed as a Division I-AA Independent. The Blazers finished their third and final season at the I-AA level with a record of five wins and six losses (5–6).

Schedule

References

UAB
UAB Blazers football seasons
UAB Blazers football